Buckeye Township, Kansas may refer to:

 Buckeye Township, Dickinson County, Kansas
 Buckeye Township, Ellis County, Kansas
 Buckeye Township, Ottawa County, Kansas

See also 
 List of Kansas townships
 Buckeye Township (disambiguation)

Kansas township disambiguation pages